Lonchocarpus yoroensis is a species of plant in the family Fabaceae. It is found in Honduras, Mexico, and Nicaragua.

References

yoroensis
Flora of Honduras
Flora of Mexico
Flora of Nicaragua
Critically endangered plants
Endangered biota of Mexico
Taxonomy articles created by Polbot